DYBU may refer to:

DYBU-FM, an FM station in Cebu City under the brand 97.9 Love Radio.
DYBU-TV, a UHF TV station in Cebu City under TV Natin.